Zealandia, formerly known as the Karori Wildlife Sanctuary, is a protected natural area in Wellington, New Zealand, the first urban completely fenced ecosanctuary, where the biodiversity of 225 ha (just under a square mile) of forest is being restored.  The sanctuary was previously part of the water catchment area for Wellington, between Wrights Hill (bordering Karori) and the Brooklyn wind turbine on Polhill.

Most of New Zealand's ecosystems have been severely modified by the introduction of land mammals that were not present during the evolution of its ecosystems, and have had a devastating impact on both native flora and fauna. The sanctuary, surrounded by a pest-exclusion fence, is a good example of an ecological island, which allows the original natural ecosystems to recover by minimising the impact of introduced flora and fauna.

The sanctuary has become a significant tourist attraction in Wellington and is responsible for the greatly increased number of sightings of species such as tui and kākā in city's suburbs.

Sometimes described as the world's first mainland island sanctuary in an urban environment, the sanctuary has inspired many similar projects throughout New Zealand, with predator-proof fences now protecting the biodiversity of many other areas of forest. Examples include the  lowland podocarp forest remnant of Riccarton bush/ Putaringamotu, the 98 hectare Bushy Park and, the 3500 hectare Maungatautari Restoration Project enclosing an entire mountain.

History 

Historically about 60% of the Wellington region was covered with broadleaf forest.  Karaka, kohekohe, ngaio and nikau trees were common but there were also rata, rewarewa and tawa with occasional podocarps like kahikatea and rimu. The whole sanctuary valley was covered with this sort of forest until European settlement of the area and the large fires in 1850 and 1860 that cleared the land to be used for farming.  The lower reservoir, retained by an earth dam, was completed in 1878. Parts of the area continued to be farmed up until 1906 when the remaining catchment was purchased for the water works. The upper reservoir, retained by a concrete gravity arch dam, was completed in 1908. From this point, as the whole valley was a protected water catchment area for Wellington city, the slopes were re-vegetated with introduced trees and the native forest also began regenerating.  The upper dam was decommissioned as a reservoir about 1991, the lower one in 1997.

Jim Lynch promoted the idea of a wildlife sanctuary. The "Natural Wellington" project identified the reservoir catchment as having special significance because it is a large self-contained habitat suitable for a wide variety of native plants and animals. In 1993 a feasibility study was carried out by the Wellington regional and city councils and after public consultation in 1994, the idea of a sanctuary was given the go-ahead.  The Karori Wildlife Sanctuary Trust was formed in mid-1995 to implement the proposed 'mainland island' wildlife sanctuary.

The project was featured in The Guardian in 2022.

Pest-exclusion fence 

The most crucial aspect of the sanctuary is a pest-exclusion fence, designed to exclude fourteen species of non-native land mammals ranging from deer to mice, which encircles the 8.6 km perimeter of the Sanctuary. Construction of the fence was completed in late 1999 and all mammalian pests within the perimeter were then eradicated over a nine-month period. This predator-proof fence is of great conservation significance, being a world first design to bar all terrestrial mammals from mouse size up.

Species to be excluded by the fence 

 Black rat
 Cat
 Fallow deer
 Ferret
 Goat
 Hare
 Hedgehog
 Mouse
 Norway rat
 Pig
 Rabbit
 Possum
 Stoat
 Weasel

The fence design was arrived at after trials with the various species to be excluded. Its main features are a small mesh size (to exclude animals down to the size of a mouse), a curved top-cap (to prevent animals climbing over) and an underground foot (to prevent animals burrowing underneath).

In terms of its meeting conservation goals, the sanctuary has met with considerable success due to the design of the perimeter fence.  The fence and ongoing monitoring have successfully kept the sanctuary free of all but the smallest species – the house mouse. It is thought that small defects in the fence mesh (damaged during construction) allowed mice to re-enter the sanctuary.  Modifications to the fence have been considered in an attempt to permanently exclude mice, but meanwhile, mouse numbers are monitored and controlled.  There have been occasional breaches of the fence by weasels and rats, these occasional incursions are not unexpected (for example resulting from storm damage bringing trees down upon the fence), and are picked up by on-going monitoring with tracking tunnels.

Restoration 

The flora and fauna in the sanctuary are recovering from its pre-managed degraded state. Although the original primary forest has been regenerating since 1906, it is still only in the early stages of succession with small hardy trees such as mahoe dominating. Members of the original flora that are missing from the site, or rare, include large podocarp species such as rimu, matai, miro, kahikatea, and totara, are being re-established. Northern rātā has also virtually disappeared from the valley and a number of seedlings have been planted. A wide variety of native trees, of benefit to native fauna, is already present including a mature colony of the New Zealand tree fuchsia, Fuchsia excorticata.

Species 

 Native birds that have been released in the sanctuary since 2000 include:
Bellbird, New Zealand (Anthornis melanura)
 Brown teal (Anas chlorotis) (4 pair released 2000-11-03)
 Kākā, North Island (Nestor meridionalis) (3 released 2002-08-24)
 Kākāriki, red-fronted parakeet (Cyanoramphus novaezelandiae) (23 released 2010-July-02)
 Little spotted kiwi (Apteryx owenii) (20 released 2000-07-04)
 Pigeon, New Zealand (Hemiphaga novaeseelandiae) (10 released 2002 to 2005)
 Robin, North Island (Petroica longipes) (40 released 2001-05-11)
 Saddleback, North Island (Philesturnus rufusater) (39 released 2002-06-16)
 Scaup, New Zealand (Aythya novaeseelandiae) (1 pair released 2002-05-03)
 Stitchbird (Notiomystis cincta) (30 released 2005-02-17)
 Takahē, South Island (Porphyrio hochstetteri) (2 released 2011-01-28)
 Tomtit, North Island (Petroica macrocephala toitoi)
 Weka, North Island (Gallirallus australis) (4 pair released 2000-06-16)
 Whitehead (Mohoua ochrocephala) (released 2001, 2002)
Rifleman (Acanthisitta chloris) (60 birds released 2019)
 Other native animals that have been released since 2000 include:
 70 tuatara, Sphenodon punctatus, from Stephens Island (released December 2005).
 100 giant weta
 21 Maud Island frogs (2006)
Spotted skink (Oligosoma kokowai) (2016)
 200 New Zealand freshwater mussel (2018)
 Other native species that are naturalised without needing transfers from outside the area include:
Birds
Black shag (Phalacrocorax carbo novaehollandiae)
 Fantail, North Island (Rhipidura fulginosa placabilis)
 Falcon, New Zealand (Falco novaeseelandiae)
 Grey warbler, New Zealand (Gerygone igata)
 Little black shag (Phalacrocorax sulcirostris)
 Little shag (Phalacrocorax melanoleucos brevirostris)
 Pied shag, New Zealand (Phalacrocorax varius varius)
 Morepork (Ninox novaeseelandiae)
 Silvereye (Zosterops lateralis)
 Shining cuckoo (Chrysococcyx lucidus lucidus)
 Tui (Prosthemadera novaeseelandiae)

 Reptiles
 Raukawa gecko (Woodworthia maculata)
 Ngāhere gecko (Mokopirirakau aff. granulatus 'Southern North Island)
 Brown skink (Oligosoma zelandicum)
 Northern grass skink (Oligosoma polychroma)
 Copper skink (Oligosoma aeneum)
 Ornate skink (Oligosoma ornatum)
 Non-native species Perch'. In 2021 the water level in the lower reservoir was reduced by six metres to enable eradication of the introduced European perch which were eating native fish species and polluting the water with algal bloom.

References

External links 

 ZEALANDIA
 Karori Sanctuary Trust
 Some thoughts on predator exclusion fences

News
 Meet the Locals (TVNZ) segment on KWS
 Asia Downunder (TVNZ) segment about Zealandia

Articles containing video clips
Nature reserves in New Zealand
Protected areas of the Wellington Region
Tourist attractions in Wellington City
Wildlife sanctuaries of New Zealand
Parks in Wellington City
Urban forests in New Zealand